The Naic Military Agreement was a document prepared on April 18, 1897 in which a number of participants in the Tejeros Convention repudiated the convention results. This repudiation, which followed the Acta de Tejeros issued on March 23, would later cost Andres Bonifacio his life. Bonifacio would be tried for treason at Maragondon, Cavite on May 10, 1897 and sentenced to death.

English translation

The Act was handwritten in the Tagalog language. An English translation follows:

Note: Signatures in the above where spelling is uncertain are indicated by [?].

References

1897 in the Philippines
History of Cavite
Philippine Revolution
March 1897 events